Antoine de La Torré (29 September 1787 - 8 February 1851) was a French officer who participated in the French conquest of Algeria.

Early life

Antoine de la Torré was taken prisoner by the French army in Tudela or Ocaña. He then enlisted in the troupes coloniales as an officer in Joseph Napoleon's Regiment.

French conquest of Algeria

De La Torré was put on leave from military rank on 8 October 1830. He was then appointed major in the occupied city of Algiers on 11 May 1831 during the French conquest of Algeria.

De La Torré proved himself during three military campaigns on Algerian soil: the first lasting from 11 June 1831 to 27 October 1834, the second from 10 January 1836 to 25 February 1839, and the third from 12 April 1840 to 21 March 1845.

Each fight against the Algerian resistance fighters presented him a new opportunity to show his bravery and to give the measure of his military value on African soil.

Citations

As Commandant during the First Battle of Boudouaou (25 May – 30 May 1837), de La Torré was awarded the General Order of the African Army on 2 June and 22 June 1837.

His name is cited in the Governor-General of Algeria's special report (27 June 1840) and again in the report of the general commanding the province of Oran and in the agenda of the same date (1 December 1840).

First Battle of Boudouaou

The fight of Boudouaou, a notorious strategic battle for the conquest of Kabylia during the French wars in Africa, granted La Torré the opportunity of a promotion. 

The Boudouaou victory earned de La Torré the rank of lieutenant-colonel on 3 September 1837 and the colonel of the 13th Light Infantry Regiment on 20 June 1840.

Awards
De La Torré was decorated with the Legion of Honour on 4 October 1823, promoted to French officer on 30 May 1837 after the First Battle of Boudouaou, and then decorated with the title of Commander on 2 October 1842.

Colonel de La Torré was naturalized a French citizen by the ordinance of 21 December 1844; he was then appointed on 26 February 1845 as first class commander in Oran.

Death
After retiring from the French Army on 27 May 1845, Colonel de la Torré died at the age of 64 in the city of Nice on 8 February 1851.

Gallery

See also
 Battle of Tudela
 Battle of Ocaña
 Joseph Napoleon's Regiment
 French conquest of Algeria
 Expedition of the Col des Beni Aïcha (1837)
 First Battle of Boudouaou (1837)

Bibliography

References

1787 births
Spanish military personnel
1851 deaths
Deaths in France
French Army officers
French Algeria
1830s in Algeria
Chevaliers of the Légion d'honneur
Commandeurs of the Légion d'honneur